This is the list of annual winners for the Detroit Film Critics Society Award for Best Ensemble.

2010s
2017: The Post
The Big Sick
Lady Bird
Mudbound
Three Billboards Outside Ebbing, Missouri
2018: Vice
Crazy Rich Asians
Eighth Grade
The Favourite
Roma
2019: Once Upon a Time in Hollywood
Dolemite Is My Name
The Farewell
The Irishman
Parasite

2020s
2020: Minari
Da 5 Bloods
Ma Rainey's Black Bottom
One Night in Miami...
The Trial of the Chicago 7

References

See also
Robert Altman Award
Screen Actors Guild Award for Outstanding Performance by a Cast in a Motion Picture

Detroit Film Critics Society Awards
Film awards for Best Cast